China Car of the Year is an award presented to the winning car launched in China during the course of the year. The first year of the awards was 2014. It is judged by an independent panel made up of automotive journalists and experts. Along with the most prestigious “Car of the Year” award, there are additional categories including SUV of the year, Green car of the year, Performance car of the year, and Design of the year.

2021 Awards

The 2021 awards were announced at Guangzhou Auto Show on 20 November 2020.

Geely Preface Car of the Year

2020 Awards
The 2020 awards were announced on 21 November 2019 at the Guangzhou Auto Show.

 Mazda3 Car of the Year
 Mercedes-Benz GLE SUV of the Year
 Porsche Taycan Green Car of the Year
 Porsche 911 Performance Car of the Year
 Bentley Flying Spur Design Car of the Year

2019 Awards

 Lexus ES Car of the Year
 Volkswagen Touareg SUV of the Year
 Jaguar I-Pace Green Car of the Year
 Lamborghini Urus Performance Car of the Year
 Volvo XC40 Design Car of the Year

2018 Awards
 Volvo S90 Car of the Year
 Range Rover Velar SUV of the Year
 Honda CR-V Hybrid Green of the Year
 Ferrari 812 Superfast Performance Car of the Year
 Range Rover Velar Design Car of the Year

2017 Awards

 Mercedes-Benz E-Class LWB Car of the Year
 Tesla Model X Green Car of the Year
 Mazda CX-4 Design Car of the Year
 Porsche 718 Performance Car of the Year
 Bentley Bentayga SUV of the Year

2016 Awards
 Geely GC9 Car of the Year
 Lexus NX 300h Green Car of the Year
 Mercedes-Benz AMG GT S Design Car of the Year
 Ferrari 488 GTB Performance Car of the Year
 Volvo XC90 SUV of the Year

2015 Awards
 Honda Odyssey Car of the Year
 BMW i3 Range Extended Green Car of the Year
 Jaguar F-Type Car Design of the Year
 McLaren 650S Performance Car of the Year
 Porsche Macan SUV of the Year

2014 Awards
The 2014 Awards was the first year of the China Car of the Year. The Mercedes-Benz S-Class took the award, with the Range Rover and Ford Mondeo coming second and third.

 Mercedes-Benz S-Class Car of the Year
 Porsche Panamera E-Hybrid Green Car of the Year
 DS 5 Design Car of the Year
 Porsche 918 Spyder Performance Car of the Year

References

External links

Motor vehicle awards
Awards established in 2014